Whiz Quiz is a local TV program produced by WPBS-TV in Watertown, New York. It invites over 30 high-schools from across the North Country to participate in a quizbowl-style tournament. It debuted in 1980, and has been on the air since. The show  airs on WPBS Mondays through Thursdays at 7:30 p.m in the months of October and November. The American Championship Game starts at 8:00 p.m. The Championship Match is an hour-long show, with double the amount of questions.

Whiz Quiz was hosted by Glenn Gough, a former sports anchor for WWNY-TV. In the fall of 1979, Glenn joined WPBS as a producer. In 1980, when Whiz Quiz premiered, he was co-host alongside Eddie Carvin. Glenn was on the show from its inception until his retirement in 2018. Glenn was replaced by Jeremy Graves for the 2018 season. Jeremy has since been replaced by Joleene DesRosiers for the 2019 season.

Format
Whiz Quiz is a knock-out bracket style tournament. A school progressively competes against other schools until that school loses. One loss means elimination from the competition. The team that competes on television consists of four players. However, a school's entire team may have many more alternates and also includes the advisor(s).

The team of four stands behind a booth with four buzzers. In 2007 the booths were painted orange, an endorsement of WPBS's support for Syracuse University. The game lasts for 25 minutes and is divided into four rounds. Correct answers score ten points, Bonus questions score 15. The winner and runner-up of the entire competition receive trophies as well as cash scholarships granted by the Rotary Club.

The Canadian and American Finals as well as the international finals are hour-long games.  The first and second International Finals were won by Carthage Central High School (of Carthage, NY, US, led by coach Jennifer Hanno) in 2001 (team members: Justin Reilly, Aaron Kratzat, Dustin Lackey, Joshua Pucci) and 2002 (team members: Justin Reilly, Aaron Kratzat, Nathan Wakefield, Robert Newton, Erik LaLone, Lauren Streeter).

Round 1: Smart Start
The teams are individually asked questions. The other team cannot answer the question. Five seconds are given to teammates to converse with each other and ring in to give an answer. Around 12 questions are asked in this round. Questions are worth 10 points each.

Round 2: One-on-One
The players are matched up against corresponding position players on the other team. Chair 1 against chair 1, Chair 2 against Chair 2, etc. Talking with teammates is not allowed in this round. 12 questions are asked in this round; 3 to each chair. Questions are worth 10 points each.

Round 3: Know-And-Tell
Know-And-Tell is a toss-up round, in which either team can answer. Tossups are worth 10 points each. Conversations with team members are allowed. Some questions have bonuses attached to them. Bonus questions are worth fifteen points and awarded to the team that gets the related question right. This round concludes with a section called four of a kind. Four questions of a common topic are asked.

Round 4: Think Fast
In this round, wrong answers now yield a free question for the other team that the incorrect team cannot answer. Originally, the rules stated that wrong answers would yield a deduction of points from a team's score. If a tie results at the end of this round, the game continues in a sudden death format. The next team to answer correctly wins. Questions are worth 10 points each.

Whiz Quiz Canada
During December after the conclusion of the American Championship is the airing of Whiz Quiz Canada, a two-week competition involving students from eight schools in the Kingston and Ottawa areas; the rules of the game are the same as the American competition. That series concludes with an hour-long competition between the Canadian and American champions, which airs late in December. Debuting in 2001, the Canadian version generally runs for one week (Monday to Friday), followed by a Canadian championship tournament the following week and the international tournament the night after.

Participating High Schools

 Alexandria Bay High School
 Bayridge Secondary School
 Beaver River High School
 Belleville-Henderson High School
 Carthage High School
 Clifton Fine Central School
 Colton-Pierrepont Central School
 Copenhagen Central School
 Edwards Knox Central School
 Franklin Academy
 Frontenac Secondary School
 General Brown High School
 Gouveneur High School
 Harrisville Central School
 Hermon Dekalb Central School
 Heuvelton Central School
 Holy Cross Catholic Secondary School
 Canton High School
 Immaculate Heart Central
 Indian River High School
 LaFargeville Central School
 LaSalle Secondary School
 Lisbon Central School
 Lisgar Collegiate Institute
 Lowville Academy
 Loyalist Collegiate and Vocational Institute
 Lyme Central School
 Madrid-Waddington Central School
 Massena Central High School
 Morristown Central School
 North Addington Education Centre
 Norwood Norfolk Central School
 Ogdensburg Free Academy
 Potsdam High School
 Sackets Harbor Central School
 Saint Lawrence Central School
 Sandy Creek High School
 South Jefferson High School
 South Lewis School
 Sydenham High School
 Thousand Islands Central School
 Watertown High School

References

External links
 WPBS: "Whiz Quiz"

Student quiz television series
1980 American television series debuts